Soumaïla Coulibaly may refer to:

 Soumaïla Coulibaly (footballer, born 2003), French footballer
 Soumaïla Coulibaly (footballer, born 1978), Malian footballer